Petar Šegedin (14 September 1926 – 14 October 1994) was a Yugoslav steeplechase and long-distance runner.

Šegedin won the 3000 m steeplechase silver medal at the 1950 European Athletics Championships. He placed 6th in the same event at the 1948 Summer Olympics in London. His personal best over 3000 metres steeplechase was 8:47.8, set in 1953. He twice won the Yugoslavian Athletics Championships over 5000 m (1948 and 1950) and set five national records in this event.

Šegedin was a member of AK Jug, Dubrovnik and AK Partizan, Belgrade.

Sources
 Petar Šegedin at sports-reference.com
 European Championships (men)
 Atletski savez Beograda - Atletičari  
 

1926 births
1994 deaths
Yugoslav male steeplechase runners
Croatian male long-distance runners
Yugoslav male long-distance runners
Olympic athletes of Yugoslavia
Athletes (track and field) at the 1948 Summer Olympics
Athletes (track and field) at the 1952 Summer Olympics
European Athletics Championships medalists
People from Orebić
Mediterranean Games silver medalists for Yugoslavia
Mediterranean Games medalists in athletics
Athletes (track and field) at the 1951 Mediterranean Games